Brestnitsa is a village in Yablanitsa Municipality, Lovech Province, northern Bulgaria.

References

Villages in Lovech Province